The ZP-150 was one of the earliest commercially available laptops.  It was released in late 1984 by Zenith Data Systems.

Market life
The main target market was the U.S. government and "the mobile executive", for on-site applications. Its relatively small dimensions and light weight allowed it to be easily carried in a standard briefcase or the included carrying case.

Hardware specifications
Weight: 
Dimensions: 13"W × 11.1"D × 1.8"H
RAM: 32K, expandable to 416K
ROM: 224K, plus 2 sockets for software expansion
CPU: Intel 80C88
Power: 12VDC or 10 AA alkaline batteries (providing 15 hours run-time w/o modem), plus internal nickel-cadmium battery for retaining memory while off, up to 8 days
Ports:
Parallel printer
RS-232C
Telephone line (300 baud modem)
System bus
BCR (for a bar code reader)
CMT (for data cassette recorder)
ACP (for acoustic coupler)
Handset (of telephone)
LCD display (80 characters/line with 16 lines), contrast control, volume control, and low-battery indicator
75-key typewriter-style keyboard

The stock 32K RAM could hold up to 10 typewritten pages.  The main methods of file transfer were via the modem or the RS-232C port and a file transfer program.

Software specifications
The ZP-150 came with a built-in System Manager and calculator program, as well as a special version of Microsoft Works 1.10 stored in ROM.  Most programs are very similar to the desktop versions, but with reduced functionality.

Word word processor
Plan electronic spreadsheet, similar to Multiplan (spreadsheet size up to 255 rows x 63 columns)
Calendar appointment organizer with alarm 
File database manager 
Telcom telecommunications package 
BASIC program editor and compiler

Accessories
ZP-150-1 power transformer
ZP-150-2 32K RAM module
ZP-150-4 Parallel to Centronics printer cable
CB-5063-27 File transfer software

Historical significance
The most significant aspect of the ZP-150's history is that it is not remembered as one of the first portable computers, despite its relatively early appearance in the marketplace and being referred to in advertising as a "laptop".  Like the IBM PC and Apple II computers, the ZP-150 was quickly copied.  The most well-known clone is the Tandy 600, which was very similar in packaging, software, and hardware except for the addition of a floppy drive and the lacking of BASIC. This was not the first laptop that Tandy manufactured, but was one in the TRS-80 line.

See also
History of computing hardware
Laptop

References
ZP-150 User's guide, (1985) Zenith Data Systems Corporation, St. Joseph, MI and Heath Company, Benton Arbor, MI
Heathkit catalogs, Fall 1985 (No. 870R) pp90-91, Winter 1986 (No. 201) p89, Fall 1987 (No, 207) p84
OLD-COMPUTERS.com Museum TRS-80 Model 600
8bit-Micro.com - TRS-80 Laptops

External links
IEEE Annals of the History of Computing
Tandy 600 and Zenith ZP150 photographic comparison of the internal hardware of the Tandy 600 and the Zenith ZP-150
Zenith Data Systems company timeline
 

Zenith Data Systems laptops
IBM PC compatibles